Toyin Tofade is a Nigerian professor. She is the first black woman to become the President of Albany College of Pharmacy and Health Sciences.

Education
She obtained a bachelor's degree in Pharmacy from Obafemi Awolowo University,Ile-Ife. A Master's degree in Pharmacy Practice and a Doctor of Pharmacy (Pharm.D.) degree from UNC Eshelman School of Pharmacy, Chapel Hill.

In 2016, Tofade became the Dean and Professor at the Howard University College of Pharmacy in Washington, D.C.

Academic Career 
Toyin Tofade was appointed in 2020 as president-elect of the International Pharmaceutical Federation (FIP) academic pharmacy section, making her the first female black woman to be named an FIP fellow.

References

Living people
Nigerian academics
Obafemi Awolowo University
Year of birth missing (living people)